Bucellarii (the Latin plural of Bucellarius; literally "biscuit–eater") were formations of escort troops used in the Roman Empire in Late Antiquity. They were employed by high-ranking military figures (such as Flavius Aetius and Belisarius) or civil office-holders. Their name is derived from the type of bread rations eaten by these troops, so-called buccellatum. The term bucellarii came into common use during the reign of Emperor Honorius. 

According to Jon Coulston, one bucellarii regiment is attested in the Notitia Dignitatum. The creation of the bucellarii reflected an increase in the "use of armed retinues by public officials" in the Roman Empire. These armies were, therefore, associated with the decline of imperial authority because they demonstrated that it no longer had the monopoly of violence. The bucellarius had close ties with its commander, supporting him in his quarrel with other commanders and even against the Empire, court, and emperor. This is shown by the army of Heraclian, which was used in his attempt to seize Roman Italy from Emperor Honorius. 

Coulston notes that the bucellarii provided the best cavalry in 5th and 6th century Roman armies, and were "recruited from Romans, Persians, Goths, and Huns, amongst others". The recruitment of soldiers of barbarian origin is well-documented as evidenced in the description of the army inherited by Constantius' widow Galla Placidia. The poet Claudian also described the bucellarii as an army of barbarians under the employ military figures, politicians, and warlords such as Stilicho, Aetius, and the praetorian prefect Rufinus.

The bucellarii generally received the highest salaries and were armed with the best equipment from the empire's factories. Some sources state that the bucellarii were mercenaries and describe their leaders as soldiers of fortune. This was particularly the case for the military companies that operated in Italy from the sixth to seventh centuries.

See also
 Bucellarian Theme
 Ka'ak

Explanatory notes

Citations

General and cited sources 

 
 
 
 

Late Roman military units
Military units and formations of the Byzantine Empire
Types of cavalry unit in the army of ancient Rome